Xerasia is a genus of fruitworm beetles in the family Byturidae. There are four described species in Xerasia.

Species
 Xerasia grisescens (Jayne, 1882)
 Xerasia meschniggi (Reitter, 1905)
 Xerasia punica Goodrich & Springer
 Xerasia variegata Lewis, 1895

References

Further reading

 
 

Byturidae
Articles created by Qbugbot